Fouad Said (born 1933) is an Egyptian producer, cinematographer and filmmaker.

Early life and education 
Said graduated from USC School of Cinematic Arts. He received his master's degree from University of Southern California in 1973. He completed his thesis on the diversification of the Cinemobile Systems company from equipment truck production to film production.

Career 
He is best known for inventing Cinemobile, a mobile movie studio, which was developed on the set of the TV series I Spy and proved influential in Hollywood. Said conceived of the precursor to the Cinemobile while working for producer Sheldon Leonard in Hong Kong. He converted a Ford econoline panel truck so that it would load onto cargo planes and filled it with all the necessary equipments, such as cameras and generators. He later earned a Scientific and Engineering Award from the Academy of Motion Picture Arts and Sciences in 1969 "for the design and introduction of the Cinemobile series of equipment trucks for location motion picture production".

Said funded a development studio with $10 million in outside investment. Taft Broadcasting later became the parent company of the studio, with United Artists Theatre Group and Hemdale Film Corporation as investors.

Select credits 

 Virgin Sacrifice (1959) – associate producer, cinematographer
 3 Nuts in Search of a Bolt (1964) – cinematographer
 I Spy (1965–68) – location cinematographer
 Hickey & Boggs (1972) – producer
 Across 110th Street (1972) – producer
 The Deadly Trackers (1973) – producer
 Aloha Bobby and Rose (1975) – producer

References

External links
 
 

Egyptian film producers
1933 births
Living people
Egyptian cinematographers
USC School of Cinematic Arts alumni